The ZPU (meaning "anti-aircraft machine gun mount") is a family of towed anti-aircraft guns based on the Soviet 14.5×114mm KPV heavy machine gun. It entered service with the Soviet Union in 1949 and is used by over 50 countries worldwide.

Quadruple (ZPU-4), double- (ZPU-2 and ZU-2) and single-barreled (ZPU-1) versions of the weapon exist.

Precursor 

The first dedicated Soviet mount for anti-aircraft machine guns was developed around 1928 by Fedor Tokarev and was adopted for service in 1931. It was a base for mounting up to four 7.62 mm PM M1910 (Russian Maxim) guns. This was also called a ZPU, although the name М-4 was also assigned to it. It served the Soviet armed forces in all major conflicts until 1945.  12.7 mm DShK 1938 was used an anti-aircraft weapon it was mounted on pintle and tripod mounts, and on a triple mount on the GAZ-AA truck. Late in the war, it was mounted on the cupolas of IS-2 tanks and ISU-152 self-propelled guns. As an infantry heavy support weapon it used a two-wheeled trolley which unfolded into a tripod for anti-aircraft use.

Description
Development of the ZPU-2 and ZPU-4 began in 1945, with development of the ZPU-1 starting in 1947. All three were accepted into service in 1949. Improved optical predicting gunsights were developed for the system in the 1950s.

All weapons in the ZPU series have air-cooled quick-change barrels and can fire a variety of ammunition including API (B32), API (BS41), API-T (BZT) and I-T (ZP) projectiles. Each barrel has a maximum rate of fire of around 600 rounds per minute, though this is practically limited to about 150 rounds per minute.

The quad-barrel ZPU-4 uses a four-wheel carriage similar to that once used by the obsolete 25 mm automatic anti-aircraft gun M1940. In firing position, the weapon is lowered onto firing jacks. It can be brought in and out of action in about 15 to 20 seconds, and can be fired with the wheels in the traveling position if needed.

The double-barrel ZPU-2 was built in two different versions; the early model has large mud guards and two wheels that are removed in the firing position, and the late model has wheels that fold and are raised from the ground in the firing position.

ZPU-2 turned out to be too heavy for the Airborne Troops, so a new UZPU-2 (later redesignated as ZU-2) was developed from ZPU-1.

The single-barrel ZPU-1 is carried on a two-wheeled carriage and can be broken down into several 80-kilogram pieces for transport over rough ground.

Versions of the weapon are built in China, North Korea and Romania.

History

The series was used during the Korean War by Chinese and North Korean forces, and was later considered to be the most dangerous opposition to U.S. helicopters in Vietnam. Later it was used by Morocco and the Polisario Front in the Western Sahara War. It was also used by Iraqi forces during Operation Desert Storm and again in Operation Iraqi Freedom. In 1974 the Cyprus National Guard artillery batteries used their ZPU-2s against the Turkish air force.
In the Russian military, it was replaced by the newer and more powerful ZU-23 23 mm twin automatic anti-aircraft gun.

During the Lebanese Civil War, the Lebanese militias mounted the ZPU-2 and ZPU-4 on various vehicles, such as M113 armored personnel carriers, to create self-propelled support vehicles.

The ZPU has seen widespread use by both sides in the Libyan Civil War, Syrian Civil War, and Yemeni Civil War, being often mounted on technical pickup trucks. The weapon is credited for bringing down several Syrian Air Force helicopters.

In North Korea, ZPU systems have been modified to be able to be directed by a MR-104 "Drum Tilt", where the guns are shown to be fired without personnel manning them.

Ammunition
 API (BS.41): Full metal jacket bullet round with a tungsten carbide core.
 API-T (BZT): Full metal jacket round with a steel core. Tracer burns to at least .
 I-T (ZP): "Instantaneous Incendiary" bullet with internal fuze, incendiary in tip, tracer container in base.

Rounds are also produced by Bulgaria, China, Egypt, Poland, and Romania.

Variants

 ZPU-4
 Type 56: Chinese-built version.
 MR-4: Romanian-built version with a two-wheel carriage designed locally.
 PKM-4: Polish designation for an imported Soviet ZPU-4
 ZPU-2
 Type 58: Chinese-built version.
 PKM-2: Polish-built version.
 ZU-2
 ZPU-1
 Type 75 and Type 75-1: Chinese built-versions.
 BTR-40A SPAAG: A BTR-40 APC with a ZPU-2 gun mounted in the rear. Entered service in 1950.
 BTR-152A SPAAG: A BTR-152 with a ZPU-2 mounted in the rear. Entered service in 1952.

Specifications

Operators
Peshmerga

 
  336
  – 100 (40 ZPU-4 and 60 ZPU-2)
 
  Type-56
 
 
 
  – 15
 
  - 18
  - 18
 
 
 
  - 12
 
 
 
 
 
 
 
 
  - 4+
 
 
 
 
 
 
 
 
  – 2
 
 
  – 50
  – 40
 
 
  – 50
  – 12
 
  – 19
 
 
 
  – 36
 
 
 
  People's Defense Units (YPG): ZPU-4
  – ZPU-2
 
 
  – ZPU-2 and ZPU-4
 
 
 
 
 
 
 
  – 21
  – 38
  Transnistria
 
 
  – ZPU-1, ZPU-2 and ZPU-4
 
 
  – 36

See also
 Zastava M55
 ZU-23-2

References

 Jane's Land Based Air Defence 2005–2006. .

External links

 ZPU-1 single barrel anti-aircraft gun data sheet
 ZPU-2 anti-aircraft 14.5 mm twin guns data sheet
 http://en.rcamuseum.com/our-collection/zpu-4-anti-aircraft-gun-14-yugo
 ZPU-4 anti-aircraft 14.5 mm quadruple guns data sheet
 Video: ZPU-1 (single-barreled 14.5) being fired in Afghanistan
 Video: ZPU-2 (14.5) being fired in Syria from a technical

14.5×114mm machine guns
Anti-aircraft guns of the Soviet Union
Anti-aircraft weapons of Russia
Autocannon
Weapons and ammunition introduced in 1949
Weapons of the People's Republic of China